The Bank of London and Montreal Limited was a joint venture between Bank of London and South America (BOLSA), a subsidiary of Lloyds Bank, and Bank of Montreal. It was established in 1958 and headquartered in Nassau, Bahamas.

History

1958 Bank of London and South America, an associate of Lloyds Bank, and Bank of Montreal established Bank of London and Montreal as a 50-50 JV with headquarters in Nassau in the Bahamas.  BOLSA contributed its branches in the West Indies and northern South America, and Bank of Montreal contributed capital.
1959 BOLAM established a branch in Jamaica.
1960 BOLAM established a branch in Trinidad.
1964 Barclays Bank (Dominion, Colonial and Overseas) acquired one third of the shares of BOLAM.
1965 Mellon National Bank acquired 15% of the shares in BOLAM. Lloyds' share fell to 24%. Bolam closed its offices in Venezuela and became a large shareholder in Banco La Guaira Internacional, which had offices in Caracas and La Guaira.
1968 The Bank of England allowed Mellon to increase its shareholding to 25%.
1970 BOLSA fully acquired BOLAM, which had 28 branches throughout Latin America and the Caribbean. In the divorce, Bolsa took back its branches.  Bank of Montreal got the Bahamian and Jamaican branches, and sold the branch and operations in Trinidad and Tobago to the government there, which used the acquisition as the foundation for a new bank, National Commercial Bank.  This is now First Citizens Bank. On April 17, 1970 Bank of Montreal incorporated the branches it took over as Bank of Montreal (Bahamas & Caribbean), and in 1983 changed the name Bank of Montreal Bahamas Limited.
1971 The Government of Jamaica purchased Bank of Montreal's Jamaican operations, renaming them Bank of Surrey.  Bank of Surrey closed five months later. 
In 1988 Bank of Montreal wanted to close the Bahamian operations so the Government of the Bahamas stepped in to keep them going.  The Government of The Bahamas created a 51-49 joint venture with Euro Canadian Bank, which took over the new bank and renamed it Bank of The Bahamas.  This is now Bank of Bahamas International.	
1971 Lloyds combined Lloyds Bank Europe, BOLSA and BOLAM as subsidiaries of a new bank, Lloyds and Bolsa International Bank, of which Lloyds owned 55% and Mellon Bank 13%.  Within two years, Lloyds bought out Mellon Bank and the other minority shareholders.  It then renamed the bank Lloyds Bank International (LBI).   
1975 LBI closed the Tokyo branch that BOLAM had established in 1971.
1984 Lloyds merged in LBI.

Bank of Montreal
Lloyds Banking Group
Joint ventures
Banks established in 1958
Banks disestablished in 1984
Banks of the Caribbean
Financial services companies of the Bahamas
1958 establishments in the British Empire